Peter Ludwig Wilhelm Elsholtz (20 October 1907 – 30 August 1977) was a German stage and film actor.

Selected filmography

 Schlußakkord (1936)
 The Castle in Flanders (1936) - Lincoln
 Ride to Freedom (1937) - Adjutant des Gouverneurs
 Truxa (1937) - Truxa, Artist
 The Ruler (1937) - Ingenieur Dr. Ehrhardt
 The Citadel of Warsaw (1937) - Botkin - sein Adjutant
 The Mountain Calls (1938) - Giordano
 Revolutionshochzeit (1938) - Prosper
 The Woman at the Crossroads (1938) - Brandes
 Shadows Over St. Pauli (1938) - Martens
 By a Silken Thread (1938) - Passagier auf dem Rückkehrschiff
 Zwei Frauen (1938) - Autorennfahrer
 Verliebtes Abenteuer (1938) - Girolais, Kriminalkommissar
 Mann für Mann (1939) - Otto Sens
 Robert Koch (1939) - Virchows Sekretär Dr. Karl Wetzel
 Dein Leben gehört mir (1939)
 Maria Ilona (1939) - Pista, der Bärenbändiger
 Der letzte Appell (1939)
 The Fox of Glenarvon (1940) - Tim Malory
 The Three Codonas (1940) - Rastelli
 Achtung! Feind hört mit! (1940) - Bocks Agent im Trenchcoat
 Ritorno (1940)
 Traummusik (1940) - Hermann, Trompeter
 Counterfeiters (1940) - Fälscher
 Blutsbrüderschaft (1941) - Bertram
 Alarm (1941) - Warenhausdetektiv
 My Life for Ireland (1941) - Dr. v. Krisis
 Above All Else in the World (1941) - Dr. v. Krisis
 Riding for Germany (1941) - Deutscher Ulan
 Venus on Trial (1941) - Der Verteidiger
 Attack on Baku (1942) - Ein Leutnant, englischer Agent
 Andreas Schlüter (1942) - Der Agitator
 Front Theatre (1942) - Stabsarzt bei der 'kranken' Edith Reiß (uncredited)
 Stimme des Herzens (1942) - Volontär Bolten
 Titanic (1943) - Landarbeiter Bobby (uncredited)
 When the Young Wine Blossoms (1943) - Reeder Karstens
 Melody of a Great City (1943) - Buckel, Mitarbeiter Dr. Werners
 Street Acquaintances (1948) - Marions Freund
 Verführte Hände (1949) - Dr. Gerson
 Cuba Cabana (1952) - Polizeikommissar
 Music by Night (1953) - Pilot
 Urlaub auf Ehrenwort (1955) - SS-Gruppenführer Böttcher
 Goodbye, Franziska (1957) - Anwalt
 Winnetou and Old Firehand (1966) - Puglia (voice, uncredited) (final film role)

References

Bibliography
 Rolf Giesen. Nazi Propaganda Films: A History and Filmography. McFarland, 2003.

External links

1907 births
1977 deaths
German male film actors
German male stage actors
Male actors from Berlin
20th-century German male actors